The 1982 Busch 500 was a NASCAR Winston Cup Series racing event that took place on August 28, 1982, at Bristol International Speedway in Bristol, Tennessee.

Background
Bristol International Speedway is a NASCAR short track venue located in Bristol, Tennessee. Constructed in 1960, it held its first NASCAR race on July 30, 1961. Despite its short length, Bristol is among the most popular tracks on the NASCAR schedule because of its distinct features, which include extraordinarily steep banking, an all concrete surface, two pit roads, and stadium-like seating. It has also been named one of the loudest NASCAR tracks.

Race report
It took almost two hours and fifty minutes for Darrell Waltrip to defeat Bobby Allison and 29 other American-born drivers in front of an audience of 30,000 spectators. This would make him equal to Cale Yarborough in the number of wins at Bristol Speedway up to this point. Notable crew chiefs attending this race included Larry McReynolds, Dale Inman, Kirk Shelmerdine, Jeff Hammond, Jabe Thomas, Waddell Wilson, Jake Elder and Junie Donlavey.

Kyle Petty scored a last-place finish due to an engine problem on the second lap of this 500-lap race. Almost ¾ of a second would separate Allison from Waltrip at the finish. Three cautions occurred for 15 laps. Only seven vehicles would fail to finish the race. Other notable drivers in this race included J.D. McDuffie, Dale Earnhardt, and D.K. Ulrich.

The final pole of Tim Richmond's career would occur at this race while Al Loquasto would end his NASCAR racing career after this race. After the end of this race, Bobby Allison would take a slim lead over Terry Labonte for championship points.

Qualifying

Top 10 finishers

Timeline
Section reference:
 Start of race: Tim Richmond started out as the first-place driver, holding it for 81 laps.
 Lap 2: Kyle Petty had engine problems; making him the last-place finisher.
 Lap 28: Rick Newsom's oil pump stopped working properly.
 Lap 30: Ronnie Thomas overheated his vehicle, ending his day on the track.
 Lap 45: Al Loquasto developed major engine problems, forcing him off the track.
 Lap 50: Richard Petty's issues with his steering forced him out of the race.
 Lap 82: Morgan Shepherd took over the lead from Tim Richmond.
 Lap 83: Tim Richmond's engine acted up, bringing his race weekend to a premature end.
 Lap 166: Joe Ruttman took over the lead from Morgan Shepherd.
 Lap 168: Dale Earnhardt took over the lead from Joe Ruttman.
 Lap 169: Darrell Waltrip took over the lead from Dale Earnhardt.
 Lap 171: Terry Labonte took over the lead from Darrell Waltrip.
 Lap 173: Dale Earnhardt took over the lead from Terry Labonte, eventually losing it to Harry Gant on lap 246.
 Lap 246: Harry Gant took over the lead from Dale Earnhardt, eventually losing to Darrell Waltrip on lap 293.
 Lap 259: Joe Ruttmann had to end the day because his vehicle's rear end came off in an unsafe manner.
 Lap 293: Darrell Waltrip took over the lead from Harry Gant.
 Lap 303: Morgan Shepherd took over the lead from Darrell Waltrip.
 Lap 304: Bobby Allison took over the lead from Morgan Shepherd.
 Lap 472: Darrell Waltrip took over the lead from Bobby Allison.
 Lap 476: Terry Labonte took over the lead from Darrell Waltrip.
 Lap 478: Darrell Waltrip took over the lead from Terry Labonte.
 Lap 480: Bobby Allison took over the lead from Darrell Waltrip.
 Lap 481: Darrell Waltrip took over the lead from Bobby Allison.
 Finish: Darrell Waltrip was officially declared the winner of the event.

Standings after the race

References

Busch 500
Busch 500
NASCAR races at Bristol Motor Speedway